Vallacar Transit Incorporated (VTI) is a Philippine transportation service under the umbrella of the Yanson Group of Bus Companies (YGBC), serving as its flagship subsidiary.

The bus company is a family-owned and managed business that has grown from a lone 14-seater jeepney plying a single route called Ceres Liner, to a conglomerate of transportation companies with a combined number of operating units of 838 transport vehicles as of January 2010, operating and serving in the Visayas, as well as the Zamboanga Peninsula in Mindanao. The company pioneered inter-modal services between Negros and Cebu.

History
Dr. Ricardo Y. Yanson Sr. had a 14-seater jeepney that plied the routes in Bacolod and nearby towns in 1968.

Ricardo was fond of experimenting with motor vehicles and had a penchant for automotive body works. He tried his hands and skills in assembling more jeepneys while his wife Olivia managed the warehouse and served as the collector of the daily “boundaries” from their drivers.

Olivia quit her nursing job at a rural health unit in Dumaguete to help her husband run the small business as ‘bodegera’ by day and ‘collector’ at night.

Vallacar was originally owned by the family of Ricardo. However, Vallacar grew because Ricardo was active then, buying second-hand trucks from Manila and rebuilding them as transport units for VTI.

In the 1970s, the Yanson couple diversified into a small bus line which plied the Bacolod-Valladolid-La Carlota route or Val-La-Car for short.  It was named Ceres Liner, after Ricardo’s younger sister.

Ricardo died at the age of 86, and left the leadership and management of Vallacar Transit, Incorporated and its conglomerate to his son, Leo Rey Yanson, with the guidance of his wife Olivia.

A trail-blazer and visionary, self-made transportation tycoon Ricardo and his wife Olivia built an empire from one vehicle to a conglomerate of bus companies and the largest in the Philippines.

Under Leo Rey Yanson's leadership 
Vallacar Transit Inc. (VTI), the country’s largest bus company, recently held its annual stockholders meeting at its principal office in Barangay Mansilingan, Bacolod. In the meeting, VTI disclosed that those reelected as members of its board of directors included Olivia V. Yanson, Leo Rey V. Yanson, Ginnette Y. Dumancas, Charles M. Dumancas, Anita G. Chua, Arvin John V. Villaruel and Daniel Nicolas Golez.

Following the election of directors, the board held an organizational meeting where Leo Rey Yanson was reappointed as chairman of the board and president of VTI, while VTI co-founder Olivia V. Yanson was reappointed as corporate secretary and treasurer.

With firm grip of control to the family's Bus Conglomerate, Leo Rey Yanson, as president and chief executive officer of both Vallacar Transit Inc. (VTI) and Ceres Liner Travel and Tours Inc. (CLTTI), gave the assurance in a statement on Tuesday after presiding the latter’s annual stockholders meeting at their principal office in Barangay Mansilingan here on Monday.

Under Leo Rey Yanson's leadership, the Yanson Group of Bus Companies (YGBC) is currently composed of more than 4,800 buses, 18,000 employees providing public transportation to around 700,000 people daily in the Philippines.

VTI Brands 
Ceres Liner was the first branding under Vallacar Transit Incorporated which was named after the youngest sister of the founder, Ricardo Yanson Sr. As their operations expanded, several brands are added with different functions and area of operations.

Bases 

Their subsidiaries are sub-divided by bases. These are based on their area of their operation, and their base number shall be the prefix number for their bus fleets. Yanson Group started this practice in 2005 after they bought out Lilian Express Inc., and felt that re-organizing their company is needed.

There are four bases under Vallacar Transit Incorporated:

Destinations 
Since the re-organization of Yanson Group of Bus Companies in 2005, Rural Transit of Mindanao is sub-divided into bases in which has different areas of service and destinations.

Bacolod Base 

The Bacolod Base is located at Masilingan, Bacolod with its terminal hub at Ceres Bus Liner North Terminal, Mandalagan, Bacolod and at Bacolod South Terminal, Luzuriaga St, Bacolod. It is also the main base for Vallacar Transit Incorporated. The base is assigned as Base 5 of Yanson Group of Bus Companies. Their routes are from Bacolod to the rest of the Negros Island Region, Cebu and Zamboanga City.

From North branch
 Bacolod – Cebu City via Escalante/Tabuelan
 Bacolod – Victorias City
 Bacolod – Cadiz
 Bacolod - Sagay City/Vito
 Bacolod – Escalante
 Bacolod – San Carlos City via Cadiz
 Bacolod – San Carlos City via Salvador Benedicto
 Bacolod – Dumaguete via Escalante/San Carlos
 Bacolod – Zamboanga City via Cadiz/San Carlos City/Dumaguete/Dipolog/Ipil/Dapitan

From South branch
 Bacolod – Cebu City via Toledo City/Salvador Benedicto/San Carlos City
 Bacolod – Cebu City via Kabankalan City/Mabinay
 Bacolod – Dumaguete via Kabankalan City/Mabinay
 Bacolod – La Carlota City
 Bacolod – La Castellana
 Bacolod – Brgy. Ma-ao, Bago
 Bacolod – Canlaon via San Carlos 
 Bacolod - Canlaon via Magallon 
 Bacolod - Canlaon via Biak na Bato 
 Bacolod – Kabankalan City
 Bacolod – Isabela
 Bacolod – Sipalay City via Cauyan
 Bacolod - Sipalay City via Candoni
 Bacolod – Hinoba-an
 Bacolod – Candoni
 Bacolod – Binalbagan
 Bacolod – Bayawan via Mabinay
 Bacolod – Zamboanga City via Kabankalan City/Mabinay/Dumaguete/Dipolog/Ipil/Dapitan

Loop Service
 San Carlos City - Canlaon

Iloilo Base 
Iloilo Base is located at Jaro, Iloilo City with three terminal hubs at the new Ceres Terminal, Brgy. Balantang, Jaro, Iloilo City, Iloilo – Antique Bus Terminal at San Pedro St, Molo, Iloilo City and Festive Walk Transport Terminal, Iloilo Business Park, Mandurriao, Iloilo City. The base is assigned as Base 6 of Yanson Group of Bus Companies. Their routes are from the cities of Iloilo and Roxas to the rest of Western Visayas.

Northern lines: From Ceres Terminal, Jaro, Iloilo City
Iloilo City – Barotac Viejo & V.V.
Iloilo City – Concepcion via Sara, Ajuy & V.V.
Iloilo City – Balasan & V.V.
Iloilo City – Estancia via Balasan & V.V.
Iloilo City – Carles & V.V.

Central lines: via Passi City (From Ceres Terminal, Jaro, Iloilo City)
Iloilo City – Passi City & V.V.
Iloilo City – Calinog via Passi City & V.V.
Iloilo City – Roxas City via Passi City & V.V.
Iloilo City – Kalibo via Passi City & V.V.
Iloilo City – Caticlan via Kalibo & V.V.
Iloilo City – Buruanga via Kalibo & V.V.

Central lines:  From Festive Walk Transport Terminal, Iloilo Business Park, Mandurriao, Iloilo City
Iloilo City – Kalibo International Airport
Iloilo City – Caticlan Airport via Kalibo & V.V.
Iloilo City – Iloilo International Airport

Central lines: From Ungka Terminal, Pavia, Iloilo
Iloilo City – Roxas City via Calinog, Tapaz, Dumalag & V.V.
Iloilo City – Kalibo via Calinog, Tapaz, Jamindan & V.V.
Iloilo City – Jamindan via Calinog, Tapaz & V.V.
Iloilo City – Tapaz via Calinog & V.V.

Antique lines: From San Pedro, Molo Terminal, Iloilo City
Iloilo City – Caticlan via San Jose De Buenavista & V.V.
Iloilo City – Kalibo via San Jose, Culasi, Pandan, Libertad & V.V.
Iloilo City – Culasi
Iloilo City – Pandan
Iloilo City – Libertad
Iloilo City – Bugasong
Iloilo City – San Jose via Tobias Fornier/Anini-y/Casay
Iloilo City – Dao via Anini-y

Loop Service: Plying Roxas City-Estancia & V.V.
Roxas City – Estancia & V.V.
Roxas City – Balasan via President Roxas, Pilar & V.V.

Dumaguete Base 
Dumaguete Base is located at Calindagan Road, Dumaguete with its own terminal hub at the same location. The base is assigned as Base 7 of Yanson Group of Bus Companies. Their routes are from Dumaguete to the rest of the Negros Island Region, Cebu and Zamboanga City.
 Dumaguete – Cebu City via Oslob
 Dumaguete – San Carlos City
 Dumaguete – Bayawan 
 Dumaguete - Siaton
 Dumaguete – Hinoba-an
 Dumaguete – Sipalay City
 Dumaguete - Tanjay City/Pamplona
 Dumaguete – Bacolod via Mabinay
 Dumaguete - Bacolod via San Carlos
 Dumaguete – Kabankalan City via Mabinay
 Dumaguete – Mabinay
 Dumaguete - Ayungon
 Dumaguete - Bindoy
 Dumaguete - Jimalalud
 Dumaguete – Guihulngan City
 Dumaguete – Manjuyod
 Dumaguete – Cubao via Mabinay/Kabankalan City/Bacolod
 Dumaguete – Bais
 Dumaguete – Canlaon
 Dumaguete - Tagbilaran City, Bohol via Cebu City
 Bayawan – Cebu City via Dumaguete
 Bayawan – Mabinay via Dumaguete
 Sipalay – Cebu City via Dumaguete
 Dumaguete - Valencia via Bagacay/Bacong
 Dumaguete - Zamboanga City via Dapitan City/Dipolog City/Ipil
Dumaguete - Kalumboyan via Bayawan
 "Sleeping" or last trips from Dumaguete will spend the night on their respective bus stops such as Dumaguete to Tanjay, Bindoy, Ayungon, Tayasan and Jimalalud.

Cebu Base
Cebu Base is located at Rizal Ave. Ext., Cebu City and Ouano Ave., Mandaue City with three terminal hubs at Cebu North Bus Terminal at SM City Cebu, Cebu South Bus Terminal at N. Bacalso Avenue of Cebu City, and the Ayala Malls Central Bloc terminal located in Cebu IT Park, Cebu City. The base is assigned as Base 8 of Yanson Group of Bus Companies. Their routes are from Cebu City to the rest of Metro Cebu, Central Visayas, Eastern Visayas, Zamboanga del Norte and Zamboanga City.

Northern lines: From Cebu North Bus Terminal, North Reclamation Area, Cebu City

 Cebu City – Maya (Daanbantayan) via Bagay
 Cebu City – Daanbantayan Proper via Kawit
 Cebu City – Maya (Daanbantayan) via Main line 
 Cebu City – Bogo
 Cebu City – Tacloban City via Bogo/Palompon
 Cebu City – San Isidro via Bogo/Palompon
 Cebu City – Hagnaya (San Remigio) via Bogo
 Cebu City – Hagnaya (San Remigio) via Tabuelan/Maravilla/Victoria/Lambusan
 Cebu City – Lambusan (San Remigio) via Hagnaya
 Cebu City – Bantayan via Santa Fe/Hagnaya Port 
 Cebu City – Madridejos via Bantayan/Santa Fe/Hagnaya Port 
 Cebu City – Tabogon via Borbon
 Cebu City – Tuburan via Tabuelan

Southern lines: From Cebu South Bus Terminal, N. Bacalso Ave. Cebu City

 Cebu City – Bato (Samboan) via Oslob/Liloan Port/Santander (loop service)
 Cebu City – Malabuyoc via Oslob/Samboan/Ginatilan
 Cebu City – Bato (Samboan) via Barili (loop Service)
 Cebu City – Alcoy
 Cebu City – Carcar
 Cebu City – Argao
 Cebu City – Moalboal
 Cebu City – Zamboanga City via Bato/Dipolog City/Dapitan City Port
 Cebu City – Sibonga
 Cebu City – Siquijor via Oslob/Liloan Port (operated by Sugbo Urban)

Central-Western lines: From Cebu South Bus Terminal, N. Bacalso Ave. Cebu City

 Cebu City – Balamban via Toledo City
 Cebu City – Toledo City
 Cebu City – Pinamungajan via Toledo City

Metro Cebu Lines:

 Danao - Plaza Independencia (Cebu City) via Robinsons Galleria Cebu/Mabolo/Maguikay/Consolacion
 Danao - Mactan Newtown (Lapu-Lapu City) via Jagobiao/Pacific Mall
 Cebu IT Park - Consolacion via Banilad/Talamban/Tintay Public Market/Cabancalan/Jagobiao
 Cebu IT Park – Mactan Newtown (Lapu-Lapu City) via Banilad/Cabangcalan/Parkmall/Pacific Mall/Marina Mall/MEPZ 1 (Operated by Sugbo Transit)
 Il Corso – Cebu IT Park via SM Seaside/N. Bacalso/Fuente Osmeña/Ayala (Operated by CIBUS)
 Parkmall (Mandaue City) – Tintay Public Market (Talamban, Cebu City) via Cabancalan/Maguikay/Guizo/Mantuyong/Centro/Ibabao/Pacific Mall/Basak/Canduman (Modern jeepney type)

Fleet 
Vallacar Transit Incorporated has several units from Chinese brand buses. Some of their fleets are also provided by their parent company's coach building division, Vallacar Transit Incorporated – Transport Engineering and Bus Body Assembly Plant (VTI-TEBBAP).

Airconditioned Units 
 Viking (Built in-house, exclusive)
 Yanson Legacy Mark I (Prototype)
 Yanson Crius RK1JMT Legacy
 Yanson Legacy (Built in-house, exclusive)
 Yanson 4th Generation Viking (King Long XMQ6111Y Yanson Modified)
 Yanson 7th Generation Viking (Hino RK1JMT, RK8JSUA Footlong)
 Yanson 8th Generation Viking (Hino RK1JMT, RK8JSUA Footlong)
 Yanson 9th Generation Viking (Hino RK1JMT, RK8JSUA Footlong)
 Yanson 10th Generation Viking (Hino RK1JMT, RK8JSUA Footlong)
 Yanson 11th Generation Viking (Hino RK1JMT, RK8JSUA Footlong)
 Yutong ZK6858H
 Yutong ZK6827H/HYG
 Yutong ZK6876H/HYG
 Yutong ZK6119HYG
 Yutong ZK6127H
 Yutong ZK6107HA
 Yutong ZK6127HYG
 Yutong ZK6128HGE Lowfloor
 King Long XMQ6111Y
 King Long XMQ6119T
 King Long XMQ6127G Lowfloor
 King Long XMQ6129Y5A
 King Long XMQ6129Y5
 King Long XMQ6129Y
 King Long XMQ6871CY
 King Long XMQ6111CY
 King Long XMQ6125AY
 King Long XMQ6128AYW
 King Long XMQ6668AYD5D1 (Modern jeepney type)
 Higer KLQ6118HKQ2A
 Higer KLQ6123K
 Higer KLQ6129G
 Hino XZU342LJ PUV Class II (Modern jeepney type)
 Zhongtong LCK6108H (Service bus)
 Zhongtong LCK6935H (Service bus)

Ordinary Fare Units 
 Yanson FB4J Coaster
 Yanson FB4J Catseye
 Yanson Crius RK
 Yanson Crius FF1J
 Yutong ZK6827H/HYG
 Kinglong XMQ6119T
 Kinglong XMQ6821CY
 Kinglong XMQ6107AYW
 Santarosa PKB212 (Service bus)
Most ordinary buses are built in-house with the exception of a few King Long built units which are deployed in Ceres Liner, Bachelor Express, Island City Express, Rural Transit and Southern Star.

Yanson Group of Bus Companies

These are the subsidiary companies under the parent Yanson Group of Bus Companies (YGBC) owned by the Yanson family of Negros Occidental as of 2016 operating in Luzon, Visayas and Mindanao making it one of the biggest bus conglomerates in Southeast Asia.

Vallacar Transit Incorporated (VTI) / Ceres Liner Travel and Tours, Inc. (CLTTI) 
Started in 1968, Vallacar Transit Incorporated is the first subsidiary of the Yanson Group of Bus Companies. It started with Ceres Liner which is named after the founder's younger sister. By 1980, Ceres Liner was covering the whole province of Negros.

The company was founded in 1968 by Ricardo B. Yanson (died October 25, 2015) and his wife, Olivia Villaflores Yanson, beginning with the purchase of one jeepney unit. This effort ultimately became a jeepney-assembly business. In the early 1970s, the market was flooded with Ford Fieras; the couple decided to diversify into a small bus line which plied the Bacolod-Valladolid-La Carlota route (hence, ValLaCar) and christened it as the Ceres Liner.

The Ceres Liner grew and expanded through the years. Their service had reached from Negros to the Visayan provinces of Iloilo, Capiz, Aklan, Cebu, Bohol and Leyte, as well as Zamboanga del Norte and Zamboanga City in Mindanao.

In 2007, Ceres Liner's Iloilo base pioneered travel between Iloilo City and Metro Manila through the Western Nautical Highway. Proving to be profitable, Yanson Group expanded its Metro Manila operations and later established Ceres Transport in 2009.

In 2016, Ceres Liner bought around 70 bus franchises from D' Rough Riders Express. It then formed a new brand as Sugbo Transit which is named after the old name of Cebu, Sugbo. Currently, the said branding is under the management of Ceres Liner's Cebu Base.

On December 5, 2020, Vallacar Transit Inc. (VTI) reappoints Leo Rey Yanson as the chairman of the board and president during their firm’s annual stockholders meeting at its principal office in Barangay Mansilingan, Bacolod. During their meeting, it was released that Olivia V. Yanson, Leo Rey V. Yanson, Ginnette Y. Dumancas, Charles M. Dumancas, Anita G. Chua, Arvin John V. Villaruel and Daniel Nicolas Golez were re-elected as members of VTI’s Board of Directors.

On January 5, 2021, CLTTI re-appointed Leo Rey V. Yanson as Chairman of the Board and President of CLTTI, while Olivia V. Yanson was re-appointed as CLTTI’s Corporate Secretary and Treasurer.

Bus brands under VTI:
Ceres Liner
Ceres Tours
Sugbo Transit
Sugbo Tours

Rural Transit of Mindanao Incorporated / Bachelor Express Incorporated 

In 1981, the Yansons ventured to Mindanao. They bought out Fortune Express and Bachelor Express, both Cagayan de Oro-based bus companies in 1985, and formed Rural Transit of Mindanao. However, the formation of Rural Transit was divided from Bachelor Express when the former owners of Bachelor and Yanson Group agreed to retain the name Bachelor Express as one of the conditions of the contract of sale. Bachelor Express then retained the name Bachelor Express.

In 2005, they bought out Lilian Express Inc. and sister company Mary May Express, its fiercest business rival, and became the dominant transit company in the island of Mindanao. This expanded their operations to the whole Western Mindanao, making Rural Transit as the predominant transport operator in the Mindanao Region.

Bus Brands under Rural Transit Mindanao Incorporated / Bachelor Express Incorporated:
Rural Transit
Rural Tours
Bachelor Express
Bachelor Tours

Ceres Transport Incorporated (CTI) 

In 2007, Ceres Liner's Iloilo base pioneered travel between Iloilo City and Metro Manila through the Western Nautical Highway. Proving to be profitable, Yanson Group expanded its Metro Manila operations and established Ceres Transport in 2009, being based in Batangas City. It enabled bus services encompassing Cubao, Batangas City, Mindoro, Aklan, Antique Iloilo, Bacolod and Dumaguete.

Bus brand under this company:
Ceres Transport

Southern Star Bus Transit Incorporated 

In 2011, the conglomerate bought out St. Jude Transportation Company, a bus line based in Bohol, and renamed it Southern Star. Primarily, it was operated under the management of Vallacar Transit Incorporated. Later on, Southern Star formed its own subsidiary as Southern Star Bus Transit Incorporated.

Bus brand under this company:
Southern Star

Gold Star Bus Transit Incorporated 

In 2012, Ceres Transport Inc., bought out a franchise of Gold Star Bus Company and allowed it to operate its Batangas-Cubao and Batangas-Alabang routes. Later on, Yanson Group decided to create on its own subsidiary as Gold Star Bus Transit Incorporated, making it apart from the Ceres Transport Inc

Bus brands under this company:
Gold Star

Mindanao Star Bus Transport Incorporated 

Mindanao Star started in January 2015 when Bachelor Express bought out Weena Express and sister company People's Transport Corporation. It then formed a new subsidiary as Mindanao Star Bus Transport Incorporated, making them apart from the management of Bachelor Express. It opened opportunity for Yanson Group to serve the Davao City – Cotabato City route, which they cannot penetrate for decades.

In October 2015, Mindanao Star bought Holiday Bus, the bus line of Davao Holiday Transport Services Inc., It made them to expand their operations for Davao City – General Santos City, and General Santos City – Koronadal City route.

The stockholders of Mindanao Star Bus Transport, Inc., sister company of Vallacar Transit Inc., the country’s largest bus transport company, re- appointed Leo Rey Yanson as president.

Mindanao Star Bus Transport Inc. is part of the Yanson Group of Bus Companies which operate all throughout the Philippines including in the cities of Bacolod, Iloilo, Dumaguete, Cebu, Cagayan De Oro, Butuan, Davao, Pagadian, Dipolog, Bohol and Batangas.

Bus brands under this company:
Island City Express
Mindanao Star

See also
Ceres Transport
Mindanao Star

References

External links
Official Facebook Page of Vallacar Transit, Inc. (VTI)
Log In or Sign Up to View
Wikimapia - Let's describe the whole world!

Bus companies of the Philippines
Companies based in Bacolod
Transportation in the Visayas
Transportation in Mindanao